The Orchard Farm School District is a public school district in St. Charles County, Missouri that was formed on February 14, 1959. The schools in the Orchard Farm and Portage Des Sioux area decided to come together and form one district. There are three schools on the Orchard Farm campus.An additional school is located north of Highway 370 in St. Charles, Missouri. In August 2016, the Early Learning Center opened and now serves approximately 150 preschool students. The school district serves approximately 2,100 students in St. Charles, West Alton, and Portage Des Sioux. The school mascot is an eagle and the school colors are green and white. 

The administrators for the Orchard Farm School District are as follows: Superintendent, Dr. Wade Steinhoff; Orchard Farm High School Principal, Dr. Greg Jones; Orchard Farm Middle School Principal, Dr. Michelle Geringer; Orchard Farm Elementary Principal, Dr. Jerry Oetting; Discovery Elementary Principal, Dr. Luke Dix
 
The district has been Accredited with Distinction for numerous years and earned a St. Louis Top Workplace for four consecutive years.

Schools

Elementary School(s) 
Orchard Farm Elementary School

Discovery Elementary School

Orchard Farm Early Learning Center

Middle School(s) 
Orchard Farm Middle School

High School(s) 
Orchard Farm High School

References

External links

School districts in Missouri
Education in St. Charles County, Missouri
1959 establishments in Missouri
School districts established in 1959